Daniel 'Dani' Bouzas Pan (born 21 January 1974) is a Spanish retired professional footballer who played as a right midfielder.

Football career
Born in Arteixo, Province of A Coruña, Galicia, Bouzas made his professional debuts in 1994 with Sporting de Gijón, being irregularly used over the course of two-and-a-half La Liga seasons. In December 1996 he moved to the second division with Albacete Balompié, again with inconsistent results – he only played 16 matches out of 42 in his final year.

Bouzas returned to the top level again, signing with Rayo Vallecano, but only appeared five times in his two-season spell, which also included a loan at CD Toledo. His career would then be resumed in the third division, with CD Castellón, CD Logroñés (two years), CD Linares (five) and Deportivo Alavés.

External links

1974 births
Living people
Spanish footballers
Footballers from Galicia (Spain)
Sportspeople from the Province of A Coruña
People from A Coruña (comarca)
Association football midfielders
La Liga players
Segunda División players
Segunda División B players
Tercera División players
CF Fuenlabrada footballers
Sporting de Gijón B players
Sporting de Gijón players
Albacete Balompié players
Rayo Vallecano players
CD Toledo players
CD Castellón footballers
CD Logroñés footballers
CD Linares players
Deportivo Alavés players
CD Móstoles footballers